Dermomurex antecessor is a species of sea snail, a marine gastropod mollusk in the family Muricidae, the murex snails or rock snails.

Description
The length of the shell varies between 10 mm and 17 mm.

Distribution
This species occurs in the Caribbean Sea off Panama.

References

 Merle D., Garrigues B. & Pointier J.-P. (2011) Fossil and Recent Muricidae of the world. Part Muricinae. Hackenheim: Conchbooks. 648 pp. page(s): 223

External links
 

Gastropods described in 1975
Dermomurex